Ellaichami is a 1992 Tamil language drama film directed and produced by K. Rangaraj. The film stars R. Sarathkumar and Rupini, with Nassar, Vetri Vigneshwar and  Gowri playing supporting roles. It was released on 11 September 1992.

Plot

Minor Muthurasu is a rich man in his village and womaniser who raped the village girls. While in the nearby village, Ellaichami is a brave village chieftain and he protects the village. Ellaichami's sister and the village's veterinarian are in love. One day, Kaveri comes to Ellaichami's village to find out the person who raped her but she didn't see the culprit's face. Ellaichami promises to not prepare any ceremony until he catches the rapist. In the meantime, Ellaichami's sister becomes pregnant. Ellaichami, worried to prepare her wedding as soon as possible, lies that he raped Kaveri. Ellaichami marries Kaveri and his sister marries her lover at the same time.

The villagers elect a new village chief because Ellaichami's image is deteriorated. Kaveri reveals to Ellaichami that she lied and nobody raped her. Kaveri turns out to be Minor Muthurasu's relative. In the past, Minor Muthurasu compelled her to marry her but she refused and fled. Kaveri landed in Ellaichami's village and met his sister who gave her that idea.

Cast

R. Sarathkumar as Ellaichami
Rupini as Kaveri
Nassar as Minor Muthurasu
Vetri Vigneshwar
Gowri
R. Sundarrajan
Senthil
Kovai Sarala as Savitri
V. R. Thilakam
Kokila as Karuvayi
Vadivu
M. R. Krishnamurthy as Panchangam
Raja Bahadur as Kadhirvelu
Peeli Sivam
Ponnambalam as Malayandi
Thideer Kannaiah
Azhagu
John Babu

Soundtrack

The film score and the soundtrack were composed by S. A. Rajkumar. The soundtrack, released in 1992, features 6 tracks with lyrics written by Pulamaipithan and S. A. Rajkumar.

References

1992 films
1990s Tamil-language films
Indian action drama films
Films scored by S. A. Rajkumar
Films directed by K. Rangaraj
1990s action drama films